Oregon's at-large congressional district is a former United States congressional district. During its existence, Oregon voters elected a Representative of the United States House of Representatives at-large from the entire state.

History
The district came into existence when the U.S. state of Oregon was admitted to the Union on February 14, 1859. Its first representative, La Fayette Grover, had been elected in June 1858 in anticipation of statehood, but since Congress delayed action until February 1859, Grover served only 17 days as Representative.

The district ceased to exist after the 1890 U.S. census apportioned another representative to Oregon beginning with the 53rd United States Congress which convened on March 3, 1893. Binger Hermann was Oregon's last at-large Representative. He represented Oregon's 1st congressional district beginning in 1893.

List of members representing the district

References
 General

 Congressional Biographical Directory of the United States 1774–present

 Specific

1859 establishments in Oregon
1893 disestablishments in Oregon
At-large United States congressional districts
At-large
Constituencies disestablished in 1893
Constituencies established in 1859
Former congressional districts of the United States